The M Countdown Chart is a record chart on the South Korean Mnet television music program M Countdown. Every week, the show awards the best-performing single on the chart in the country during its live broadcast.

In 2013, 30 singles ranked number one on the chart and 24 music acts were awarded first-place trophies. Eight songs collected trophies for three weeks and achieved a triple crown: "Caffeine" by Yang Yo-seob, "I Got a Boy" by Girls' Generation, "Gone Not Around Any Longer" by Sistar19, "Dream Girl" by Shinee, "Gentleman" by Psy, "This Love" by Shinhwa, "Give It to Me" by Sistar, and "Growl" by Exo. Of all releases for the year, only one song earned a perfect score of 10,000 points: "I Got a Boy" by Girls' Generation.

Scoring system 
Digital Single Sales 50%, Album Sales 10%, Age Preference 20%, Global Fan Vote 5%, Live Show Preferences 10%, SMS Vote 5%.

Chart history

References 

2013 in South Korean music
2013 record charts
Lists of number-one songs in South Korea